Antoinette Byron (born 1 December 1962) is an Australian actress. She is best known for playing  Natalie Nash on the Australian soap opera Home and Away.

Career
Byron made her acting debut in the Australian soap opera The Restless Years as Tracey Williams in 1977.  She later played roles in series such as Bellamy, Scales of Justice, Special Squad, The Henderson Kids and in soap operas such as Prisoner,
Starting Out and Neighbours. She later portrayed the first Skye Chandler on the soap opera All My Children from 1986 to 1987 before been replaced by Robin Christopher. Byron then took a main role on the Fox short-lived sitcom Women in Prison.

Byron later was cast in the role of Natalie Nash on the Australian soap opera Home and Away, taking over from original actress Angelica la Bozzetta and debuted in the 1999 season premiere. She later appeared in Skirts, Jake and the Fatman, E Street, Time Trax, Melrose Place, Savannah, Baywatch, High Tide, Pacific Palisades, and Malcolm in the Middle. 

She has also appeared in TV movies such as Skin Deep, Crime of the Decade and theatrical films including Fast Talking,  Rebel, Death of a Soldier and Man with the Screaming Brain.

Filmography

Film

Television

References

External links

Living people
Australian film actresses
Australian soap opera actresses
1962 births